Brad Lynch may refer to:
 Brad Lynch (footballer) (born 1997), Australian rules footballer
 Brininstool + Lynch, Chicago architecture firm named for partners David Brininstool and Brad Lynch